Earth: The Power of the Planet is a British documentary television series that premiered on BBC Two on 20 November 2007. The five-part series is presented by geologist Iain Stewart.

In the United States, the series was broadcast in 2008 on the National Geographic Channel as Earth: The Biography.

During filming in Madagascar, a new species of ant was discovered by Brian Fisher and named after Stewart: Cerapachys iainstewarti.

Episodes

Merchandise 
A two-disc DVD of the series was released on 14 January 2008, followed by a two-disc Blu-ray set of the series being made available on 15 September 2008.

A 240-page hardcover book written by Iain Stewart and John Lynch covering the topics seen in the episodes was released prior to the series being broadcast on 18 October 2007.

See also 
 Earth Story
 How the Earth Was Made

References

External links
 

Earth: The Power of the Planet at the University of Plymouth

2007 British television series debuts
2007 British television series endings
2000s British documentary television series
BBC television documentaries about history
Documentaries about geology
English-language television shows